Safashahr(Dehbid) (also Romanized as Şafāshahr; formerly, Dehbid (Persian: دهبید )) is a city and capital of Khorrambid County, Fars Province, Iran.  At the 2006 census, its population was 22,254, in 5,556 families.

References

Populated places in Khorrambid County

Cities in Fars Province